"" is a Latin Eucharistic hymn recorded in the Antiphonary of Bangor.

History
"" was composed at Bangor Abbey in the 7th century AD, making it the oldest known Eucharistic hymn.

It was carried to Bobbio Abbey and was first published by Ludovico Antonio Muratori in his  (1697–98), when he discovered it in the Biblioteca Ambrosiana.

Lyrics

References 

7th century in music
Latin-language Christian hymns
7th-century poems